Abdul Aziz Yusif (born 10 November 1991) is a Ghanaian professional footballer who plays as a winger and striker for Budaiya Club in Bahrain.

Career

Early career
Yusif started his career with Royal Knights FC, before moving to top-tier club Real Tamale United during 2009-2010 Glo Ghana Premier League.

Kotoko
On 9 January 2013, Yusif signed a two-year contract with Ghana Premier League side Asante Kotoko after impressing during his debut seasons at Real Tamale United.

Smouha
On 5 August 2014, Yusif signed a three-year contract with Egyptian giants Smouha SC on a free transfer. He scored his debut goal in a 3-2 pre-season friendly win over Al Teram FC on 20 August 2014.

AC Tripoli
On 1 September 2015, Yusif joined Lebanese Premier League club AC Tripoli on a two-year contract.

Al Shabab Club
After nearly 15 official goals for AC Tripoli, Aziz moved to Bahraini Premier League side Al-Shabab.

AC Tripoli
After a season at AL Shabab Club, Aziz rejoined AC Tripoli on 1 January 2018.

On 7 May 2015 it was announced that he would trial with Major League Soccer side New York Red Bulls.

Budaiya Club
In January 2020, Yusif returned to Bahrain and joined Budaiya Club.

Personal Honours
Real Tamale United
Second Top Scorer 2010–11 Ghanaian Premier League

References

1991 births
Living people
Ghanaian footballers
Association football forwards
Ghana Premier League players
Egyptian Premier League players
Lebanese Premier League players
Bahraini Premier League players
Saudi Second Division players
Real Tamale United players
Asante Kotoko S.C. players
Smouha SC players
AC Tripoli players
Al-Riyadh SC players
Expatriate footballers in Egypt
Expatriate footballers in Lebanon
Expatriate footballers in Bahrain
Expatriate footballers in Saudi Arabia
Ghanaian expatriate sportspeople in Egypt
Ghanaian expatriate sportspeople in Lebanon
Ghanaian expatriate sportspeople in Bahrain
Ghanaian expatriate sportspeople in Saudi Arabia
Place of birth missing (living people)